The Third Periodic Review of Westminster constituencies was undertaken in the United Kingdom between 1976 and 1983 by the Boundary Commissions. This resulted in significant changes to the electoral map. The previous 635 seats were replaced with 650 seats, of which 90% were newly created or significantly revised. The new boundaries were first used for the 1983 general election.

Changes
The Review abolished some long-established constituencies such as Bedford, Colchester, Moray and Nairn, and Oxford which were generally split to accommodate growing populations.

References

Periodic Reviews of Westminster constituencies
1980s in the United Kingdom